Robinson Leyer (born March 13, 1993) is a Dominican professional baseball pitcher who is a free agent. He has played in Major League Baseball (MLB) for the Boston Red Sox. He made his MLB debut with Boston in 2020.

Career

Chicago White Sox
On November 6, 2011, Leyer signed with the Chicago White Sox as an international free agent. Leyer pitched in the farm system of the White Sox from 2012 through 2017. With the White Sox, he advanced from the Dominican Summer League to the Double-A level.

Cincinnati Reds
On March 21, 2018, Leyer was traded to the Cincinnati Reds. With the Cincinnati Reds organization in 2018, he pitched for the Double-A Pensacola Blue Wahoos, registered a 2.59 earned run average (ERA) in 42 relief appearances spanning 59 innings pitched. On November 2, 2018, Leyer elected free agency.

Seattle Mariners
On January 4, 2019, Leyer signed a minor league contract with the Seattle Mariners. In 2019, with the Mariners organization, Leyer reached the Triple-A level for the first time, appearing in 13 games with the Tacoma Rainiers of the Pacific Coast League, recording a 4.58 ERA and 27 strikeouts in  innings pitched. He was released by the Mariners on June 15, 2019.

Boston Red Sox
The Boston Red Sox signed Leyer as a minor league free agent on June 22, 2019. That season, Leyer appeared in a total of 18 games with the Class A Short Season Lowell Spinners and the Double-A Portland Sea Dogs. Through eight seasons from 2012 to 2019, Leyer appeared in 236 minor league  games (84 starts), compiling a 28–43 record with 4.24 ERA and 522 strikeouts in  innings pitched.

The Red Sox called Leyer up to the majors for the first time on August 31, 2020. He made his debut the same night against the Atlanta Braves, pitching one inning, giving up two hits, one earned run, and one walk while striking out one batter, Marcell Ozuna. He was optioned back to Boston's alternate training site on September 18. Overall with the 2020 Red Sox, Leyer appeared in six games (one start), compiling an 0–0 record with 21.21 ERA and 9 strikeouts in  innings pitched. On October 26, Leyer was assigned to Triple-A and outrighted off of the 40-man roster. He became a minor-league free agent on November 2, 2020.

Minnesota Twins
On February 8, 2021, Leyer signed a minor league contract with the Minnesota Twins organization.

References

External links

 SoxProspects.com

Living people
1993 births
Major League Baseball players from the Dominican Republic
Major League Baseball pitchers
Boston Red Sox players
Dominican Summer League White Sox players
Bristol White Sox players
Kannapolis Intimidators players
Winston-Salem Dash players
Birmingham Barons players
Glendale Desert Dogs players
Leones del Caracas players
Pensacola Blue Wahoos players
Tigres del Licey players
Tacoma Rainiers players
Arkansas Travelers players
Lowell Spinners players
Portland Sea Dogs players
Naranjeros de Hermosillo players
Dominican Republic expatriate baseball players in Mexico
St. Paul Saints players
Dominican Republic expatriate baseball players in Venezuela